El hijo del pueblo ("The Son of the Village") is a 1974 Mexican film. It stars Sara García.

External links
 

1974 films
Mexican musical comedy-drama films
1970s Spanish-language films
1970s Mexican films